Lucky Jack.tv is a television channel broadcasting from Luxembourg, devoted to poker and online sports betting games created in September 2010. It belongs to AB Groupe.

History
Lucky Jack.tv was created by AB Groupe and was officially launched on September 26, 2010 on TV along with its sister channel Golf Channel.

Programming
The channel broadcasts shows on the theme of poker and online gambling and betting:
Learn From the Pros
Pro-Am Poker Equalizer
Jackpot TV: jouer devant votre tv comme au casino (play in front of your TV like at the casino)

It also broadcasts many poker tournaments like:
European Poker Tour
World Series Of Poker
World Poker Tour
National Heads Up Poker Championship
Poker After Dark
Head's up poker : le face à face
Degree Poker Championship
as well as the television series Drôle de Poker with Arsène Mosca, Alain Bouzigues and Florent Peyre.

Broadcasting
It is broadcast on the ADSL bouquets of Bouygues, Free, Orange and SFR.

References

External links
 

Mediawan Thematics
Television stations in France
Television channels and stations established in 2010
French-language television stations
Television networks in Luxembourg